Purcell Bay is an Arctic waterway in Qikiqtaaluk Region, Nunavut, Canada. Located off northwestern Bathurst Island, the bay is an arm of May Inlet.

Other bays in the area include Dampier Bay, Stuart Bay, Shamrock Bay, and Half Moon Bay.

References

Bays of Qikiqtaaluk Region